Cayuga Independent School District is a public school district based in Cayuga, Texas (USA) in unincorporated Anderson County, Texas (USA).

In 2009, the school district was rated "recognized" by the Texas Education Agency.

Schools
Located in northwestern Anderson County, the district has three campuses:

Cayuga High School (Grades 9-12)
Cayuga Middle (Grades 6-8)
Cayuga Elementary (Grades EE-5) (2003 National Blue Ribbon School).

References

External links
Cayuga ISD

School districts in Anderson County, Texas